Alexander Germanovich Baunov (born December 4, 1969) is a Russian international policy expert, journalist, publicist, and former diplomat. Since 2015, he has been a senior associate in Carnegie Moscow Center and the editor in chief of Carnegie.ru.

Baunov is the author of the books It's a Small Myth and WikiLeaks: Diplomacy by the Back Door (both in Russian).

In 1995 he graduated from the Department of Classical Philology of the Philological Faculty of Moscow State University Lomonosov. From 1999 to 2003, he worked in the diplomatic service of the Russian Ministry of Foreign Affairs at the Embassy in Greece. From 2004 to 2008, he worked as a reporter, and then editor in the international department of the magazine Russian Newsweek. He published a number of guidebooks on Greece and its regions. From 2009 to 2015, he was a columnist and senior editor of the daily network edition www.slon.ru. In addition to slon.ru, he published in the newspaper Vedomosti, the magazine Big City, and Russian Life. He has published articles in Foreign Policy, Foreign Affairs, and The Atlantic. He regularly comments on domestic events and foreign policy issues in leading international media sources (Reuters, Associated Press, Bloomberg, The New York Times, France Presse, Forbes, El País, etc.) Since 2015, he has been the chief editor at the Carnegie Moscow Center.

In 2013, he was a finalist for the "Politischevet" publicist prize. In 2014, he was the chairman of the selection committee for the "PolitProsvet" award.

As of 2022, Baunov works as a research fellow at the Institut für die Wissenschaften vom Menschen in Vienna.

Publications 
 .
 .

References 

1969 births
Living people
Russian journalists
Moscow State University alumni
Russian diplomats
Place of birth missing (living people)
The Moscow Times
Russian activists against the 2022 Russian invasion of Ukraine